|}

The Victor McCalmont Memorial Stakes is a Listed flat horse race in Ireland open to thoroughbred fillies and mares aged three years or older. It is run at Gowran Park over a distance of 1 mile, 1 furlong and 100 yards (1,902 metres), and it is scheduled to take place each year in late April or early May.

The race is named in honour of Victor McCalmont, the Irish racing administrator and owner-breeder.

The race was run over 12 furlongs until 2000.

Winners

See also
 Horse racing in Ireland
 List of Irish flat horse races

References 

Racing Post: 

Flat races in Ireland
Mile category horse races for fillies and mares
Gowran Park Racecourse